Howard L. "Chick" Kolstad (born March 18, 1914) was an American football player and coach. He served as the head football coach at St. Norbert College in De Pere, Wisconsin from 1960 to 1978, compiling a record of 96–76–5.  The football playing field at St. Norbert is named in his honor. He, along with his brother Robert, played college football at the University of Wisconsin-Eua Claire in 1938-1939.

References

1914 births
Year of death missing
St. Norbert Green Knights football coaches
Wisconsin–Eau Claire Blugolds football players
High school football coaches in Wisconsin
People from Eau Claire, Wisconsin
Players of American football from Wisconsin